Pellescritta is a frazione of Montereale, in the Province of L'Aquila in the Abruzzo, region of Italy.

Frazioni of Montereale